Cơm rượu also known as rượu nếp cái is a traditional Vietnamese dessert from Southern Vietnam, made from glutinous rice.

To prepare cơm rượu, glutinous rice is cooked, mixed with yeast, and rolled into small balls. The balls are served in a slightly alcoholic milky, white liquid which is essentially a form of rice wine, and which also contains small amounts of sugar and salt. The dish is eaten with a spoon.

In Northern Vietnam, a similar dessert (which is thicker, with no liquid, and not made into balls) is called xôi rượu.

In Chinese cuisine, a very similar dish, often flavored with sweet osmanthus, is called jiǔniàng (酒酿) or guìhuā jiǔniàng (桂花酒酿).

See also
 Chè
 List of desserts
 Rượu nếp

External links
Cơm rượu page
Cơm rượu recipe and photo
Cơm rượu page (Vietnamese)
Hương vị ngày Tết page (Vietnamese)

Vietnamese rice dishes
Rice pudding
Rice wine
Vietnamese desserts